Chiopris-Viscone is a comune (municipality) in  the Italian region Friuli-Venezia Giulia, located about  northwest of Trieste and about  southeast of Udine. It is formed by two separate hamlets: Chiopris, which is the municipal seat, and Viscone.

Chiopris-Viscone borders the following municipalities: Cormons, Medea, San Giovanni al Natisone, San Vito al Torre, Trivignano Udinese.

References

External links
 Official website 

Cities and towns in Friuli-Venezia Giulia